Stenodactylus grandiceps, also known as the Jordan short-fingered gecko or stout gecko, is a species of lizard in the family Gekkonidae. The species is found in the Middle East.

References

Stenodactylus
Reptiles of Iraq
Reptiles of Turkey
Reptiles of Syria
Reptiles described in 1952